Vietnamochloa is a genus of plants in the grass family. The only known species is Vietnamochloa aurea, found only in Vietnam.

References

Chloridoideae
Endemic flora of Vietnam
Grasses of Asia
Monotypic Poaceae genera